Aliabad Castle is a historical castle located in Birjand County in South Khorasan Province; the longevity of this fortress dates back to the Qajar dynasty.

References 

Castles in Iran
Qajar castles